Kevin Lin (林義傑, November 19, 1976) is a Taiwanese  ultramarathon runner from Taipei.

Background
Based in Taipei, Lin is one of the best known endurance athletes in Asia. Lin, together with Charlie Engle and Ray Zahab, became the first modern runner to cross the Sahara Desert on February 21, 2007.

He had agreed to work with the H2O Africa project and be part of the first team of runners to cross the Sahara from coast to coast. The expedition was filmed and edited into a documentary, Running the Sahara, narrated by Matt Damon and released in November 2007 with the logistics support of Sam Rutherford.

The Running the Sahara project began in Senegal and went through Mauritania, Mali, Niger, and Libya before culminating in Egypt.

A full-time graduate student, he won his first ever 150-mile (241-kilometer) race across the Atacama Desert in Chile in 2004.

In September 2011 he completed an unprecedented 10,000-kilometer run of the Silk Road.

In 2016, he executive produced the sports film 10,000 Miles which stars Sean Huang, Megan Lai and Darren Wang.

References

External links
 Kevin Life 林義傑個人官方網站
 Running the Sahara
Audio Interview with Charlie Engle: Kevin's teammate speaks about the "Running the Sahara" expedition

1976 births
Living people
Sportspeople from Taipei
Taiwanese male long-distance runners
Taiwanese ultramarathon runners
Male ultramarathon runners